There is relatively little history of active practice of Hinduism in Romania, although many prominent Romanian thinkers have had an interest in Hindu thought, and since the Romanian Revolution of 1989 there have been some converts through the work of International Society for Krishna Consciousness. Hare Krishna devotee provide free food for life program and other cultural festivals around the country. Every year Hare Krishna devotee organise Rath Yatra of Lord Jagganath and thousands of people participate in the Rath Yatra.

Since 1989

The Divine Life Society and the Vedanta Society has a publishing house named Lotus in Bucharest. They publish  books on Vedic philosophy (Vivekananda, Ramacharaka, Krishnananda). The leader of Divine Life Society is honorary member A. Russu, accountable to the headquarters in Rishikesh, India.

Transcendental Meditation has been in Romania for many years. It was prohibited by the Nicolae Ceauşescu regime, but has flourished again after the revolution, especially among intellectuals. The strongholds of TM are Bucharest and Cluj-Napoca.

ISKCON has established small communities at least in Bucharest and Timișoara. In the latter city they hold monthly conferences in the Polytechnical Institute.

ISKCON (the "Hare Krishnas") is the largest Hinduist association in country. 

The Theosophical Society and the Anthroposophical Society are represented especially in Bucharest, Timișoara and Cluj. They seldom call themselves by these names, rather they name themselves "Para-Psychological Research groups". Their beliefs are very syncretistic, mixing Eastern beliefs.

Sathya Sai Baba devotees are also present in Romania.

The Sahaja Yoga movement, is led by a female guru, Sri Mataji Nirmala Devi. The followers of this "instant Yoga" are numbered by the thousands in about 10 cities.

Indians in Romania

There are currently about 1000 Indians living in Romania, most of them in Bucharest and Timișoara.

Notes

References
Ernest Valea, New Religious Movements in Romania, Spirituality in East and West / Update and Dialog nr. 2 (volume 2. no. 1), February 1993

Hinduism by country
Religion in Romania
Hinduism in Europe